Cabinet of Aleksandar Vučić may refer to:

 First cabinet of Aleksandar Vučić
 Second cabinet of Aleksandar Vučić